Harold Knight Hatfield (July 21, 1927 – October 31, 2001) was a Canadian football player who played for the Edmonton Eskimos. He previously played college football at the University of Southern California.

References

1927 births
2001 deaths
American football ends
Canadian football ends
American players of Canadian football
USC Trojans football players
Edmonton Elks players
Players of American football from California
Sportspeople from Los Angeles County, California
People from Hermosa Beach, California